Tianzhenosaurus (meaning “Tianzhen lizard”) is a monospecific genus of ankylosaurid dinosaur from the Shanxi Province that lived during the Late Cretaceous (Cenomanian-Campanian, ~99-71 Ma) in what is now the Huiquanpu Formation. Tianzhenosaurus may represent a junior synonym of Saichania, an ankylosaurine known from the Barun Goyot and Nemegt Formation.

Discovery and naming

In 1983, Pang Qiqing and Cheng Zhengwu discovered articulated cervical vertebrae of an ankylosaurid from the Shanxi Province. Numerous excavations at the site yielded more than 2,300 specimens belonging to sauropods, theropods, ornithopods and ankylosaurid specimens. The holotype specimen, HBV-10001, consists of a partial skull. Two paratype specimens were assigned to Tianzhenosaurus: HBV-10002, an incomplete mandible; HBV-10003, cervical vertebrae, dorsal vertebrae, caudal vertebrae, a sacral complex, ilia, pectoral girdles, pelvic girdles, fore and hind limbs with fore and hind feet, tail club and osteoderms. The holotype and paratype specimens were obtained from the Huiquanpu Formation and are housed at the Geoscience Museum, Hebei GEO University, Shijiazhuang.

The generic name, Tianzhenosaurus, is derived from the Tianzhen County and the Greek word “sauros” (lizard). The specific name, youngi, is in honour of the late Professor Yang Zhongjian ("C. C. Young"), the founder of Vertebrate Paleontology in China.

In 1999, Sullivan considered Tianzhenosaurus as a junior synonym of Saichania based on the skulls being similar in overall morphology. Additionally, Sullivan also considered Shanxia as a junior synonym of Tianzhenosaurus as the only diagnosable characteristic of Shanxia is known to be variable within a single taxon such as Euoplocephalus. Arbour & Currie (2015) also reaffirmed Tianzhenosaurus as a junior synonym of Saichania based on similar reasons provided by Sullivan (1999), but noted that if the humerus of Tianzhenosaurus is later shown to differ from that of Saichania, then could be considered as a distinct taxon.

Description
 Pang and Cheng, 1998 distinguished Tianzhenosaurus from all other ankylosaurids based on the following traits: A flat, low, medium-sized, isosceles triangle shaped skull; skull roof covered with irregular bony tubercles; a relatively long premaxilla; a small orbit surrounded by a bony ring; horizontally elongates narial openings; septomaxilla not separating the narial openings; maxillary tooth rows slightly convergent posteriorly; short basicranium; maxilloturbinal located laterally in middle part of the palatal vault; vertical occipital region; narrow and high occipital condyle; occipital condyle not visible in dorsal view; opisthotic extends lateroventrally as a curved process; mandible is deep with a convex ventral border; no mandibular ornamentation; tooth crowns have cingula on labial sides, swollen bases, and middle ridge on lingual sides; short, amphicoelous cervical centrum; dorsal centrum is long and flat at both ends; eight fused vertebrae in sacrum; short and thick anterior caudal vertebrae; narrow and elongated posterior caudal vertebrae that ended with a tail club; rectangular, plate-like scapula; proximal and distal ends of humerus are moderately expanded and not twisted; thick femur lacking the fourth trochanter; tarsometatarsal and digits that are typical for ankylosaurs.

Pang & Cheng (1998) noted that the overall skull morphology of Tianzhenosaurus was similar to that of Saichania as both taxa have an isosceles triangle shaped skull, a similar location of the orbit at the mid-posterior part of the skull, occipital condyle that do not extend beyond the posterior edge of the skull roof, and the skull roof being covered with dermal plates and bony nobs. However, Pang & Cheng also noted that Tianzhenosaurus also shared similarities to Ankylosaurus as they both have triangular shaped skulls, irregular dermal scutes covering the skull roof, posteriorly diverging maxillary tooth rows, transversely widened occipital condyle, and horizontal extension of the opisthotic and having no ventral curvature.

Classification 
Pang & Cheng (1998) originally placed Tianzhenosaurus into Ankylosauridae, but did not specify it's relationship with other ankylosaurids. Both Sullivan (1999) and Arbour & Currie (2015) considered Tianzhenosaurus as a junior synonym of Saichania based on the overall similar morphology of the skulls. Vickaryous et al. (2004) classified Tianzhenosaurus as an ankylosaurine, sister taxon to Pinacosaurus mephistocephalus, while Thompson et al. (2012) recovered Tianzhenosaurus as sister taxon to Talarurus. However, Wiersma and Irmis (2018) recovered Tianzhenosaurus as a valid taxon and interpreted it as sister taxon to Pinacosaurus grangeri.

A phylogenetic analysis conducted by Thompson et al., 2012 is reproduced below.

The results of an earlier analysis by Vickaryous et al., 2004 is reproduced below.
{{clade| style=font-size:85%;line-height:85%
|1={{clade
 |1={{clade
  |1=Lesothosaurus diagnosticus
  |2={{clade
   |1=Huayangosaurus taibaii
   |2={{clade
    |1=
    |2={{clade
     |1=Gargoyleosaurus parkpinorum
     |2={{clade
      |1=Minmi paravertebra
      |2={{clade
       |1=Gastonia burgei
       |2={{clade
        |1=
        |2={{clade
         |1=Tsagantegia longicranialis
          |2={{clade
           |1=Tarchia gigantea
           |2={{clade
            |1=
            |2={{clade
             |1=Saichania chulsanensis
             |2=Talarurus plicatospineus
             |3=}}}}}}}}}}}}}}}}}}}}}}}}}}

Paleoenvironment

The holotype specimen of Tianzhenosaurus was recovered from the Huiquanpu Formation, which possibly dates to the Cenomanian or Campanian stage of the Late Cretaceous. However, the precise dating of the formation is problematic due to the absence of index fossils and the Cretaceous age is partially based on the discovery of indeterminate pliosaur material. The Huiquanpu Formation consists of grey siltstones interbedded with red medium to coarse grained sandstones that has extensive cross-bedding. Based on the sedimentation, the formation represents a fluvial environment, with the upper part of the formation being extensively reworked by a number of early Tertiary volcanic intrusions.Tianzhenosaurus would have coexisted with the macronarian sauropod Huabeisaurus, the hadrosauroid ornithopod Datonglong, the pantyrannosaurian tyrannosauroid Jinbeisaurus and the ankylosaurine ankylosaurid Shanxia, which may represent a junior synonym of Tianzhenosaurus''.

See also

 Timeline of ankylosaur research

References

Ankylosaurids
Late Cretaceous dinosaurs of Asia
Fossil taxa described in 1998
Ornithischian genera